The City Waterworks is a historic site in Sarasota, Florida. It is located at 1005 North Orange Avenue. On April 23, 1984, it was added to the U.S. National Register of Historic Places. The Waterworks building was purchased by MethodFactory, Inc., a Microsoft Gold Partner in October 2007.  The Waterworks building is now corporate headquarters for the software development firm.
https://srqwaterworks.com

References

External links
 Sarasota County listings at National Register of Historic Places
 Florida's Office of Cultural and Historical Programs
 Sarasota County listings
 City Waterworks
  

Buildings and structures in Sarasota, Florida
Headquarters in the United States
Buildings and structures completed in 1926
Industrial buildings and structures on the National Register of Historic Places in Florida
National Register of Historic Places in Sarasota County, Florida
Water supply infrastructure on the National Register of Historic Places
1926 establishments in Florida
Water supply infrastructure in Florida